The Open ITF Arcadis Brezo Osuna is a tournament for professional female tennis players played on outdoor hard courts. The event is classified as a $60,000 ITF Women's World Tennis Tour tournament and has been held in Madrid, Spain, since 2011.

Past finals

Singles

Doubles

External links
 ITF search

ITF Women's World Tennis Tour
Hard court tennis tournaments
Tennis tournaments in Spain
Recurring sporting events established in 2011